The 1894 Oregon Webfoots football team represented the University of Oregon as a member of the Oregon Intercollegiate Football Association (OIFA) during the 1894 college football season. It was the Webfoots' first season and team was led by head coaches Cal Young and J. A. Church. They finished the season with an overall record of 1–2–1. The first Oregon football team played on the field that is now the site of the university's Computing Center and Gilbert Hall.

Schedule

References

Oregon
Oregon Ducks football seasons
Oregon Webfoots football